This is a list of curling clubs in Lithuania:

National organizations 
 Lithuania Curling Association

Teams
Main curling teams in Lithuania:
Mice on Ice
De-Arch
T-Rink
Snaikas
Nomoshiti

Lithuanian Curling Association members:
Klaipėdos ledo ritulio klubas (Klaipėda)
Skipas (Vilnius)
Arena (Vilnius)
Svajotojas (Vilnius)
Snaikas (Vilnius)
Snaigė (Ignalina)
Kerlita (Vilnius)
Kervila (Vilnius)
Lithuanian Curling Sport Federation (Vilnius)
Association Curling (Vilnius)

References 
 Teams

See also 
 List of curling clubs

Curling in Lithuania
Lithuania
Curling